

Radio Dramas

This is the list of radio dramas featuring Hong Kong actor and singer Ekin Cheng.

Note: English titles in italic indicates the name is simply a translation of the Chinese title as no official English title exists.

Cheng, Ekin
Lists of plays
Lists of radio programs
Lists of mass media in Hong Kong